The 2016 Mid-Eastern Athletic Conference baseball tournament began on May 19 and ended on May 24 at Arthur W. Perdue Stadium, in Salisbury, MD.  It was a  six-team double elimination tournament.   won their record fifteenth tournament championship and earned the Mid-Eastern Athletic Conference's automatic bid to the 2016 NCAA Division I baseball tournament.

Entering the tournament, Bethune-Cookman had claimed fourteen of the seventeen tournament championships, with Florida A&M winning in 2015, Savannah State in 2013 and North Carolina A&T earning the 2005 title.

Format and seeding
The top three teams in each division will be seeded one through three based on regular season records.  The two division winners will earn a first round bye, with the second seed from each division playing the third seed from the opposite division in the first round..  The winners advance in the winners' bracket, while first round losers play elimination games.

Bracket

References

Tournament
Mid-Eastern Athletic Conference Baseball Tournament
Mid-Eastern Athletic Conference baseball tournament
Mid-Eastern Athletic Conference Baseball